Moses Opute James, also known as Eagle (born 25 June 1968) is a Nigerian boxer. He competed in the men's light welterweight event at the 1992 Summer Olympics.

References

External links
 

1968 births
Living people
Nigerian male boxers
Olympic boxers of Nigeria
Boxers at the 1992 Summer Olympics
Place of birth missing (living people)
AIBA World Boxing Championships medalists
Light-welterweight boxers